"Para Sa Tao" (English: "For The People") is a Philippine world music song by HUMANFOLK from their eponymous first album; composed by guitarist Johnny Alegre in 2009, and which became the group's carrier hit single. The song was arranged by keyboardist-vocalist Abby Clutario. A music video directed by Daphne Oliveros was produced for the song (with an alternate, expanded version), and for which a radio edit was created. Both the full and radio edit versions of the song were included in the eponymous "Humanfolk" album, released in May 2011 by MCA Music (Universal Music Group).

On November 27, 2012, the Philippine Association of the Record Industry (PARI) conferred the Awit Award to HUMANFOLK for "Para Sa Tao" as Best World Music Recording. {Creativity Awards as recording artist, musical composer and record producer}.

Composition
The song is delivered in  quintuple time, utilizing the natural phrasing and rhythm of the lyrics. The words unfold as a children's song introducing the Abakada, the indigenized Tagalog letters of the Philippines. The verses consist of the native alphabet sung repeatedly, and gradually developed as a canon, a contrapuntal musical technique that employs overlapped imitations of a musical phrase. In the contrasting bridge, the lyrics hint at a folktale of seafarers in the north (i.e. "layag sa hilaga") setting sail for the mysterious south (i.e. "timog, mahiwaga").

The title, "Para Sa Tao", is a pun on the final cadence of the Baybayin (O/U-Pa-Ra-Sa-Ta-O/U-Wa-Ya), the Pre-Hispanic Tagalog script from which the Abakada is derived. The present-day Modern Filipino Alphabet (Filipino: "Makabagong alpabetong Filipino"), in turn, is the contemporary adaptation of the classical Abakada.

Musicians
 Abby Clutario, vocals, keyboards & Chapman Stick 
Johnny Alegre, acoustic guitar & backing vocals 
Cynthia Alexander, bass & backing vocals 
Malek Lopez, electronics 
Abe Lagrimas, Jr., drums (session) 
Uly Avante, woodblocks, shaker & pandeiro (session)

Production
Words and Music by Johnny Alegre  
Arranged by Abby Clutario  
Produced by Johnny Alegre  
Recorded by Hazel Pascua at Sound Creation Studio 
Post-production, mixing and mastering by Boyet Aquino 
Limited License issued by PH Affinity Productions to MCA Music for Distribution
OSR Released on Compact Disk by MCA Music. Executive Producer: Ricky Ilacad

Incidental music for "The Complete Para Sa Tao Video" ("Ethnic-HF1") performed by Susie Ibarra, drums & kulintang ♦ Roberto Rodriguez, cajon ♦ Cynthia Alexander, agung ♦ Johnny Alegre, tambourine ♦ Malek Lopez, electronics

References

External links
HUMANFOLK: "Para Sa Tao" (Music Video)
HUMANFOLK: The Complete "Para Sa Tao" Video
("Para Sa Tao", as theme) Books for Babuyan
("Para Sa Tao", as theme) Filip + Inna

Philippine folk songs